The Last Leaf is a short story by O. Henry published in his 1907 collection The Trimmed Lamp and Other Stories. The story first appeared on October 15, 1905,  in the New York World.

The story is set in Greenwich Village during a pneumonia epidemic. It tells the story of an old artist who saves the life of a young neighbouring artist, dying of pneumonia, by giving her the will to live. Through her window she can see an old ivy creeper (growing on a nearby wall), gradually shedding its leaves as autumn turns into winter, and she has taken the thought into her head that she will die when the last leaf falls. The leaves fall day by day, but the last lone leaf stays on for several days. The ill woman's health quickly recovers. At the story's end, we learn that the old artist, who always wanted to produce a masterpiece painting but had never had any success, spent considerable time painting with great realism a leaf on the wall for the whole night. Furthermore, the old artist himself dies of pneumonia contracted while being out in the wet and cold.

The scene of the story of "The Last Leaf" is the Greenwich artist colony in New York City. Over the past century, it has developed from a poor literati settlement to a world-famous art center and tourist attraction.

Characters
 Sue, as a young artist, who lives with her friend Johnsy
 Johnsy, another young artist, who is Sue's friend. She has pneumonia but survives due to the presence of the last leaf of an ivy plant.
 Behrman, an old artist, who dies after painting the last leaf

Adaptations
"The Last Leaf" has been adapted frequently on the stage and the big screen. Notable short film adaptations include
 The 1912 film Falling Leaves is a very loose adaptation.
 The 1917 two-reel silent film The Last Leaf, one of a series of O. Henry works produced by Broadway Star Features.
 In 1952 it was one of five stories adapted for O. Henry's Full House. In this adaptation, the protagonist's nickname is Jo, and Susan (Sue) is portrayed as a sister, not a friend.
 In 1983 a screen adaptation was done as a 24-minute film produced by the Church of Jesus Christ of Latter-day Saints. This adaptation is the same as the 1952 film version from O. Henry's Full House.
The 1986 Hindi TV series Katha Sagar adapted this for its seventh episode "Kalakriti" ('art form'), which was directed by Shyam Benegal.
Paranoia Agent's 9th 'Etc.' episode contains a segment depicting it within the context of the series.
 The 2013 Hindi film Lootera is loosely based on "The Last Leaf".
The 21st episode of the Pokémon Sun and Moon anime features a Stoutland on the brink of death. The symbol of its death, the dying tree, is a reference to the story.
The 20th episode in the 3rd season of Osomatsu-san anime features a comedic parody of the story.
The episode from the 2007 Doraemon anime series called "When the Last Leaf Falls", shows one of the side characters "Little G", falling ill and believing that the maple tree next to her bed losing leaves symbolizes the time she has left before "mountain goblins", take her away. Due to the book she reads throughout the episode having the exact same premise.

References

External links

 

Short stories by O. Henry
1905 short stories
Short stories adapted into films
Works originally published in the New York World